Nannau (English: 'the place of many streams') is a Georgian mansion and estate near the village of Llanfachreth, Gwynedd. The mansion was originally inhabited by the Nanney (Nannau) family, who were direct descendants of the House of Mathrafal, of the King of Gwynedd and Powys.

The estate of Nannau was founded by Madog ap Cadwgan, 1st Lord of Nannau, son of Prince Cadwgan ap Bleddyn (1051-1111). The Lord of Nannau title continued for four centuries, until the division of the cadet branches. The estate was then passed on to an heiress, Janet, who married into the Vaughan family of Hengwrt in 1719. In 1795 their descendants, the Vaughan baronets, replaced the then 17th-century mansion with a new house co-designed by Joseph Bromfield, which still stands today. In 1911 as recorded by Encyclopædia Britannica, the families of county rank in the neighbourhood of Dolgellau include those of Nannau, Hengwrt (the famous Hengwrt Welsh MSS), Caerynwch, Fronwnion, Bron-y-gadair, Brynygwin, Brynadda, Abergwynnant, Garthangharad.

By the mid-20th century the estate was 'wrecked' and a succession of short-term owners saw much of the land sold off, the demolition of some of the 18th-century house, and failed attempts to establish a hotel at the hall. By 2020 the lead from the roof had been stolen and the house was 'deteriorating rapidly'. Nannau is a Grade II* listed building and its parkland is listed, also at Grade II*, on the Cadw/ICOMOS Register of Parks and Gardens of Special Historic Interest in Wales.

Family history
The Nanney family of Dolgellau are descendants of the Princes of Powys through Cadwgan ap Bleddyn, second son of Bleddyn ap Cynfyn. Cadwgan's son 'Madog ap Cadwgan' became the 1st Lord of Nannau. The 2nd Lord, 'Cadwgan ap Madog', was knighted by King Henry I of England in the Duchy of Normandy and married Gwenllian, a daughter of Owain Gwynedd. The title of Lord was passed on from father to son until the early 16th century. Following the creation of the title Lord of Nannau, a prominent member of the family who became the 5th Lord was named 'Ynyr Hên'. His son, Ynyr Fychan sided with English Crown during the Conquest of Wales by Edward I and was rewarded for the capture of Madog ap Llywelyn during the revolt against the new administration. King Edward I also rewarded those who pledged allegiance by allowing them to keep their land. This marked the beginning of the Nannau estate dynasty. The effigy of the 7th Lord, Meurig ap Ynyr Fychan, is on display at St. Mary's Church, Dolgellau. Ynyr Fychan's son, Einion, later became the Bishop of St. Asaph.

The Lordship of Nannau was passed on to Hywel Sele (9th Lord of Nannau, d. 1402), probably the most famous Nannau owner, who was noted for his attempted assassination of Owain Glyndŵr on the Nannau estate, before Glyndŵr set ablaze the Nannau house. Following this incident, the house was rebuilt. This would be the first of at least five reconstructions during the Nannau family's tenure of the estate.

The family were patrons of famous poets of the period, and the mansion is mentioned in several poems from the 14th century onwards. The poet Llywelyn Goch ap Meurig Hên was a part of the family. Sion Dafydd Lâs (d. 1694), the Nannau bard family, is considered to be one of the last of the traditional family poets in Wales.

The Nannau family established a new dynasty through marriage which connected it to Tal-y-bont, Dyffryn Ardudwy and which enabled it to further its reach throughout Wales and beyond. Lands were bought in the areas of Brithdir, Dyffryndan, and Cefnyrywen, and Dolgleder, Garthgynfor and of Garthmaelan in the surrounding areas. The family established many cadet branches, beginning with Sele's brother. At the end of the 16th century, the families of Caerynwch and Cefndeuddwr emerged, and later on the family of Maes-y-Pandy. There was also an alliance with the Dolau-gwyn family.

Between 1400 and 1600, Nannau farmlands were vastly expanded, and successive Nannau lords held government posts in the vicinity of Dolgellau. A cousin of the 10th Lord sided with the House of Tudor during the Wars of the Roses and was the commander of Harlech Castle during the siege. He also fought in the Hundred Years' War in France. The family helped establish Cymer Abbey, Llanelltyd, Dolgellau and churches in North Wales still stand today. Another heiress of Nannau Estate was Alice who married a descendant of Hywel Coetmor in the 15th century. She was the sole heiress of Hywel ap Meurig of Nannau. The Lord of Nannau title endured until the 13th Lord who was the last to hold the title. This period marked the beginning of the use of surnames in Wales, and the 'Nanney' family name emerged in the early 16th century. This coincided with a new era of Welsh Hall Houses, the Snowdonia type, in particular.

For centuries, the Nanney family controlled the estate and the surrounding region. Together with the Vaughan family who claimed descent from Rodric Fawr, King of North Wales, these two families established a dynasty around the town Dolgellau, and the counties of Merionethshire and Gwynedd. At the start of the 17th century, Huw Nanney Hên built a new residence at Nannau which lasted less than a generation before being burnt to the ground around 1645 during the English Civil War. The family had to move to their more traditional second home, Dolrhyd, near the town of Dolgellau, an adjacent estate since the 16th century (The house is now a care home). 

It was only at the end of the 17th century in 1697 that a permanent residence was established at Nannau. Nannau remained a permanent residence until the eventual sale of the mansion in 1965. The need to move around due to civil strife was evident when Vaughan, 2nd Baronet, inherited the title in 1792. He also acquired six estates, namely : Nannau, Dol'Rhyd, Rhug, Hengwrt, Meillionydd and Ystum Colwyn. It is he who personally designed Nannau's Georgian mansion, and the cottages and lodges which are still in use today.

Cadet branches
The Lord of Nannau title was passed on directly through the male line of families for centuries until it ceased in the 16th century with the 12th Lord, Howel Nanney (1470-1580) who was esquire to Henry VIII, from Howel the first cadet branch was established by the Nanneys of Cefndeuddwr. The other cadet branches descended from 'Huw Nanney Hên' who would have become the 14th Lord if the title had continued, followed by his fifth son; Edward Nanney (b. 1578), from whom four more houses were descended : the Nanneys of Maesypandy; the Nanneys of Llanfendigaid, Tywyn; the Nanneys of Maes-y-neaudd, Llandecwyn, and the Nanneys of Llwyn.

The establishment of the family's cadet branches marked the end of the Nannau family direct male heir ownership. After almost 600 years, the male line ended with the tenure of Colonel Huw Nanney IV when he married Catherine Vaughan from Corsygedol. They had four daughters. He died in 1701. Then began the transition of Nannau to the Vaughan family and eventually the Vaughan baronets. Huw Nanney IV built a new mansion between 1693, and 1697. The home was sketched by artist Moses Griffith around 1797. Vaughan oversaw the design of another reconstruction of the Nannau mansion which still stands today.

Nannau Oak
 
The famous Nannau oak trees have grown in the estate's gardens since the dawn of time and have a lifespan of over 300-400 years. The most famous Oak on the Nannau estate was aply named 'Derwen Ceubren yr Ellyll', this enormous oak tree in question measured a circumference of 27ft and 6 inches. The tree was felled by lightning on the 27th July, 1813, that day it was painted by Sir Richard Hoare, 2nd Baronet. 
The tree was none other than the deathbed of Hywel Sele who was placed there by his cousin Glyndŵr and left unattended for 40 years before being found. The tree was made even more famous with Walter Scott and his 1808 work Marmion; "the spirit's Blasted Tree". 

Thomas Pennant in book 'Tours of Wales' visits Nannau in 1784 for his third volume. He describes the Oak as : “How often has not warm fancy seen the fairy tribe revel round its trunk! Or may not the visionary eye have seen the Hamadryad burst from the bark of its coeval tree?”

For a coming of age birthday in 1824 some of the oak was used to make a commemorative set for festivities, including a now famous stirrup cup. This Oak set named 'The Ceubren Cups' were auctioned in 2008 after being listed as contents of Nannau since 1958, as well as a silver mounted oak cup with the Vaughan Welsh language motto inscribed, ASGRE LÂN, DIOGEL EI PHERCHEN.

Last reconstruction of Nannau mansion
The Nannau estate merged with Vaughan family of Hengwrt at the beginning of the 18th century. Janet mother of 1st Baronet Vaughan and grand-daughter of Huw Nanney III married Robert Vaughan of Hengwrt in 1719. He was great grandson of the antiquarian Robert Vaughan. After the disastrous tenure of Hugh Vaughan (1st Baronet's brother) who “made a total shipwreck of his fortunes by his ill-regulated life and his utter incapacity for estate management”, the family established themselves as members of parliament, obtained a baronetcy, made considerable improvements to the estate, and built a new house, the current mansion completed in 1808 with surrounding estate and parks completed in 1830. The reigns of Robert Hywel Vaughan and of his son, Sir Robert Vaughan, 2nd Baronet in the late 18th and 19th centuries were considered the “golden age of Nannau”. After the death of the childless 3rd Baronet Vaughan in 1859, the estate was bequeathed via inheritance to Thomas Pryce Lloyd, a cousin from Pengwern, Flintshire. Lloyd became a 'life tenant' on the condition the estate was precluded from selling land or property. Nannau property once again changed hands in 1874 to a distant relation, John Vaughan (d. 1900), of Chilton Grove, Shropshire. Vaughan had owned the Rhug estate and was well known to the Nannau baronets, in particular the 2nd Baronet Vaughan, with whom he shared a common ancestor, Robert Vaughan (antiquarian).

Royal visits
It was the son of John Vaughan (1830-1900) who welcomed dignitaries on Queen Victoria's 4th tour of Wales. He also welcomed royal couple Princess Beatrice of the United Kingdom and her husband when Princess Beatrice laid the foundation stone of St John's Church, Barmouth on the 27th of August 1889. In April 1949 John's son Major-General John Vaughan who inherited Nannau, received another royal couple to the area of the new Nannau estate: Elizabeth II and Prince Philip, Duke of Edinburgh, with their newborn son Charles, now King of England. The royal couple stayed at 'Glyn' with Baron Harlech and visited 'Nannau' for lunch on the 29th of April 1949.

The Nannau bucket hoard
It is believed that Vaughan, 2nd Baronet, had shown great interest in antiquities and had brought a bucket covered in inches of peat bog from nearby Arthog, overlooking Mawddach estuary in 1826. The bucket turned out to be an urn from the Bronze Age possibly from East-Central Europe. An identical urn was found in Hungary. The bucket was left unattended for 60 years near the Hywel Sele lodge before it was discovered by John Vaughan's girls in 1881 and then used as a cigar ashtray and a paper waste bin until 1951 when Major-General Vaughan revealed the urn to guests. The urn was later identified as being approximately 2,700 years old by Professor Christopher Hawkes, and sent to the British Museum the following year. 

Another similar discovery named the Dowris Hoard was found in the 1820's in Dowris, County Offaly, Ireland. A late bronze age cauldron was discovered with a hoard of weapons, the discovery was from the same period as the Nannau bucket at Arthog, some of the items buried in the Snowdonia bog were later found to be from 1,100BC.

20th century onwards
The estate was sold in the mid-20th century and subsequently had a succession of short-term owners. During this period, most of the land and some of the estate buildings were sold off, as well as the fishing rights, which were given to the Hengwrt estate. In 1935, Hilary Vaughan Pritchard, son of a 3rd cousin of 2nd generation Nannau owner Major-General John Vaughan, was married to Mary, the daughter of Charles Stanley Monck. John Vaughan and Vaughan Pritchard were both descendants of Robert Vaughan, the antiquarian from Hengwrt, b.1592.

Vaughan Pritchard had acquired ownership of the Nannau estate following the Major's death in 1956. Nannau Hall became the venue for another lavish wedding when Vaughan Pritchard's daughter Susan married David Muirhead on 14th December 1957. In 1958 a schedule of contents was made of all the possessions in the Hall which was a sign of the selling off of the whole estate. The estate's running costs would have been high. Repairs alone would have cost £8,000. Following centuries of the 'Vaughan' family ownership of the Nannau Hall, it was put up for sale with 10 acres of land and sold for the price of £8k (which included the cost of refurbishment) in 1965 to Mr. Edward Morrison who was in the Royal Air Force. The remainder of the surrounding Nannau estate and Dol'Rhyd (also owned by Vaughan), a total of 3,578 acres, was sold in 1975 after 900 years of occupation, to Vaughan Gaskell from Warrington. 

Attempts to operate the house as a hotel were unsuccessful. The 18th-century flanking pavilions were demolished and the building's fabric deteriorated. By 2020, the theft of lead from the roof saw the house "deteriorating rapidly". Efforts to address the condition of the building are being undertaken by the Snowdonia National Park Authority supported by the Society for the Protection of Ancient Buildings. The house remains a private family home and is not open to the public.

Architecture and description
A Grade II* listed structure, the authors of the Gwynedd Pevsner, call the site "extraordinary” at 700 ft above sea level. In 1784 Thomas Pennant described Nannau as “perhaps the highest situation of any gentleman’s house in Great Britain”. The neoclassical house was built between about 1788 and 1805. The Georgian building was the idea of Robert Hywel Vaughan, 1st Baronet (1723-1792) and his son Robert Willames Vaughan (1768-1843) who, by 1795, completed the design process by adapting designs from a book by the architect P. F. Robinson and adding his own subtle variations and Tudor elements. The architect Joseph Bromfield was engaged by the Vaughans to help design the flanking pavilions constructed c.1805. Pevsner suggests that the whole building is likely to be attributable to him, but Cadw is less certain. The Nannau records imply that Bromfield was responsible for the wings and most of the internal decorations. However a fire in 1808 destroyed part of the building, only for Bromfield to design the rebuilding of stairs and banisters in coordination with the 2nd Baronet. 

The following quotation is from Nannau - A Rich Tapestry of Welsh History by Philip Nanney Williams on the construction of the mansion : "it was left to the 2nd Baronet to complete the design process, which he accomplished in 1795 ... In 1805 Sir Robert, 2nd Baronet, added the perfectly proportioned pavilion wings ... Sir Robert had shrewdly employed the Shrewsbury architect Joseph Bromfield to design and oversee the 1805 project. He was responsible for the wings and many of the internal decorative features."

It was during this golden age of Nannau that not only the home was rebuilt, but also the vicinity of Nannau expanded between 1805-1830, 55 miles of walling around Llanfachreth surrounded the 10,164 acre estate, and carriage driveways, arches, home farms, fishpond, a deer park, and afterwards lodges to complete the Georgian estate.

The house is of three storeys and five bays, built in slate to a square plan and with a hipped roof. The entrance front has a porch with Ionic columns and a moulded entablature above. The house is a Grade II* listed building. The park, now separated from the house, is listed at Grade II* on the Cadw/ICOMOS Register of Parks and Gardens of Special Historic Interest in Wales .

Gallery

References

Notes

Sources
 

 E. D. Jones, 'The family of Nannau of Nannau' (Cylchgrawn Cymdeithas Hanes Sir Feirionnyd, 1933)

External links

Grade II* listed buildings in Gwynedd
Registered historic parks and gardens in Gwynedd
History of Gwynedd
Welsh-language literature
Merionethshire